Friends and Legends is the second solo album by Michael Stanley.  The album title refers to the backing musicians accompanying Stanley on the album, which was recorded at Applewood Studios in Golden, Colorado.  The basic band on all tracks was Barnstorm, composed of Joe Walsh on lead guitar and synthesizer, Joe Vitale on drums, flute, synthesizer and backing vocals, and Kenny Passarelli on bass.  In addition, three members of Stephen Stills' Manassas performed: Paul Harris on keyboards, Joe Lala on percussion and Al Perkins on pedal steel guitar, and the band also included saxophonist David Sanborn.    Among the backing vocalists were Richie Furay and Dan Fogelberg.  In keeping with the collaborative spirit, J. Geils assisted with production of the saxophone tracks.

Although the album produced one of Stanley's most popular songs, "Let's Get the Show on the Road", and led to a headline spot for Stanley (backed by Barnstorm) on Don Kirshner's Rock Concert, it made little impact on the charts, partially because Stanley's all-star band was unable to tour behind it.  After this, Stanley decided to form his own band, which was named The Michael Stanley Band, so that touring would no longer be a problem.

Track listing
All tracks composed by Michael Stanley; except where indicated
"Among My Friends Again"	 
"Help!" (John Lennon, Paul McCartney)
"Yours for a Song"
"Let's Get the Show on the Road"
"Just Keep Playing Your Radio"
"Roll On"
"Bad Habits"
"Funky Is the Drummer" (Stanley, Joe Walsh, Paul Harris, Joe Vitale, Kenny Passarelli, P. Bigby, B. Lawson)
"Poets' Day"

Personnel
Michael Stanley - lead vocals, guitars
Joe Walsh - lead guitars, synthesizer
Joe Vitale - drums, flute, synthesizer, backing vocals
Kenny Passarelli - bass
Paul Harris - piano, organ, clavinette
Al Perkins - pedal steel guitar
Joe Lala - congas, timbales, percussion
Jon Bendis - acoustic guitar
David Sanborn - alto saxophone
Bill Szymczyk - percussion
Tasha Thomas - backing vocals
Lani Groves - backing vocals
Carla Hall - backing vocals
Richie Furay - backing vocals
Dan Fogelberg - backing vocals

References

1973 albums
Michael Stanley albums
Albums produced by Bill Szymczyk
MCA Records albums